Ready for the World is the debut album from the Michigan-based band Ready for the World. It was self-produced by the band and released on September 17, 1985, by MCA Records.

History
Of the nine songs appearing on the original album, a total of six were used as singles. The lead track, "Tonight", never charted on the Billboard Hot 100, only reaching number 103, but the single charted on the R&B chart, where it peaked at number 6. Their second single, "Deep Inside Your Love," also peaked at number 6 on the R&B chart.

The band would rank higher on the charts with their next single, "Oh Sheila", which peaked at number one on the Billboard Hot 100, the R&B chart, and the dance chart; it managed to reach the UK Singles Chart, where it peaked at number 50. "Digital Display" reached number 21 on the pop chart, number 4 on the R&B chart, as well as charting number 3 on the dance chart.

The last two singles, "Slide Over" and "Ceramic Girl", did not chart as well as the past singles, only reaching number 57 and 82 on the R&B chart, respectively. Later, the album cut "Human Toy" was used as the A-side and B-side for their 1986 single, "Love You Down".

Despite the last two singles' low airtime, the album itself sold well, and was later certified platinum by the Recording Industry Association of America for reaching sales of over one million copies in the United States. It reached a peak of number 17 on the pop album charts, while reaching number 3 on the R&B album charts.

Track listing
Credits adapted from Discogs.

Personnel
Credits adapted from Discogs.

Performance credits

Melvin Riley Jr. – lead vocals, guitar
Gordon Strozier – guitar, backing vocals
Gregory Potts – keyboards, backing vocals
John Eaton – bass, backing vocals
Gerald Valentine – drums, electronic drums
Willie Triplett – electronic drums, backing vocals

Production

Ready for the World –  production 
Bernard Terry – production assistant, engineering 
Louil Silas Jr. – engineering, remixing 
Greg Reiley – engineering 
Taavi Mote – remix engineering 
Dan Marnien – remix engineering assistant – 
Jim Shea – photography
Vartan – art direction
John Kosh – art direction, design
Ron Larson – art direction, design
Steve Hall – mastering

Charts

Weekly charts

Year-end charts

References

1985 debut albums
MCA Records albums
Ready for the World albums